The Semáforo de Anaga or Semáforo de Igueste is a former semaphore station located near Igueste, Tenerife, Canary Islands. Opened in 1895, it operated until 1970, after which it was abandoned.

Construction 
The sephamore tower is located in Anaga, on the north of Tenerife. This part of the island has a good view of ships arriving from Europe, whether friendly or otherwise, as well as being able to monitor the weather conditions for ships passing through the area. The first watchmen in the area were appointed by the Cabildo de Tenerife on 17 April 1506, who initially communicated via smoke and fire signals. Over the years, they warned of attacks by the British, Dutch, French, Berber and Americans.

With the invention of telegraphy, watchtowers were revolutionised. Anaga was one of the twenty semaphores designated by Spanish royal decree on 9 June 1884.

The building was constructed by the Ministry of Public Works, with funding from Hamilton & Co. The electric semaphore was received by the Ministry of the Navy in 1893. It began operation on 4 December 1895 and entered service on 20 November 1886, before being handed over to the Spanish government in December 1886. The semaphore was visited by Pascual Cervera y Topete in 1898.

Operation 
The main building is rectangular, with two attached houses for watchers, as well as other rooms including a kitchen and toilet. An attached rectangular building provided additional housing, with a third, hexagonal, building for an observatory. Two cisterns provided water, and there was an exterior bread oven. The building was modified several times while operating, with materials delivered by camel.

The mast was used to convey information about incoming ships, such as their nationality and type, using flags.

Current status 
The semaphore was handed over to the Hacienda on 2 July 1970, to be maintained as part of the state's heritage, after its operation became unnecessary due to advances in maritime communications. It ceased operations in 1971, and the building was subsequently abandoned in 1979. It is without legal protection, but was added to the heritage red list on 26 November 2015. The building has significantly delayed, with the loss of doors, windows, interior walls, the cisterns, and the decay of the roof and its facade. The signal mast has split, and several fires have happened inside the building. The roof collapsed in 2012.

In 2018, the 123rd birthday of the semaphore was celebrated by flares lit at the site, and an optical signal from the Tenerife Naval Command.

References 

Tenerife
Maritime communication